Justine Siegal (born 1975) is an American baseball coach, sports educator and the founder of Baseball For All. In 2009, she became the first female coach of a professional men's baseball team, when she worked for the Brockton Rox, in the independent Canadian American Association of Professional Baseball. In 2011, she became the first woman to throw batting practice to an MLB team, the Cleveland Indians during spring training. In 2015, hired by the Oakland Athletics for a two-week coaching stint in their instructional league in Arizona, she became the first female coach employed by an MLB team. She has also thrown batting practice to the Tampa Bay Rays, St. Louis Cardinals, Houston Astros, and New York Mets.

She is particularly interested and involved in sports gender equity, and noted for her success in coaching baseball in contexts that were previously male-only.

Siegal coached Israel National Baseball Team at the 2016 qualifier for the 2017 World Baseball classic.

Early life 
Siegal was born in Cleveland, Ohio, and is Jewish.  Her grandfather and grandmother endowed the Cleveland College of Judaic Studies, now affiliated with Case Western Reserve University called the Laura and Alvin Siegal Lifelong Learning Program. Her grandfather also led the fundraising for Israel Bonds in Cleveland for a number of years.

Siegal grew up in Cleveland Heights, a suburb of Cleveland. She was introduced to baseball at a very young age, as her grandfather Alvin Siegel frequently took her to Cleveland Indian baseball games. Her father, Michael, always signed her up for baseball, rather than for softball. At 13, her baseball coach told her she didn't belong in baseball because she was a girl and baseball was a boy's sport. She believed that this was wrong, and continued playing baseball despite people who discouraged her from playing baseball because it was a "boy's sport". At age 16 she made it her goal to coach baseball at a collegiate level, despite being discouraged by others from playing and coaching baseball at this age as well. She attended the Brewster Academy (where she played baseball for two years) and Hawken School (her freshman and senior years). In high school, she played third base and pitched.

Academic background
Siegal attended Beloit College and holds a B.A. from St. Olaf College with a concentration in "Leadership: Religion, Military, and Baseball", an M.A. in Sport Studies from Kent State University, and a Ph.D. in Sport and Exercise Psychology from Springfield College (MA). Her academic focus is in performance enhancement, leadership, sport management, coaching, gender equity, and youth sports. Siegel knew the difficulties of trying to be a baseball coach, so she went on to pursue her Ph.D to equal the level of opportunities.

Center for the Study of Sport in Society
Siegal was the Associate Director of Sports Partnerships at the Center for the Study of Sport in Society at Northeastern Universityfrom 2011-2015. As the Associate Director she worked towards expanding academic programs and relationships with Major League Baseball and other sports organizations.

Coaching youth and college baseball
In 2002, Siegal formed the Sparks, the first all-girl team to compete in a national "boys" baseball tournament. A documentary film, "Girls of Summer" (not to be confused with the 1988 film of the same title), was made about the team.

Along with coaching youth baseball, Siegal was assistant coach for the Springfield College baseball team, the only woman coach in the collegiate baseball ranks in the years of 2008-10.

In addition Siegal has been a Coach and Technical Commissioner for the World Baseball Softball Confederation (formally known as the International Baseball Federation). She has coached for the World Children’s Baseball Fair and has served as Baseball's Athlete Representative at the IOC Athlete Forum (2011)

Siegal was also Chair of the WBSC's Women’s Development Commission.

Coaching and pitching batting practice in men's professional baseball
Siegal in 2009 became the first female coach of a professional men's baseball team, when she worked for the Brockton Rox, in the independent Canadian American Association of Professional Baseball, as the first-base coach.

In 2011, at the age of 37, she was the first woman to throw batting practice to an MLB team, the Cleveland Indians during spring training. Catcher Paul Phillips, to whom she pitched, said: "I thought she did great. She would fit right in. Had you not seen her pony tails, you would not have thought anything of it." Siegal said: "This is my biggest day in baseball so far. This is the greatest game on earth."  She has also thrown batting practice to the Oakland Athletics, Tampa Bay Rays, St. Louis Cardinals, Houston Astros, and New York Mets.

Siegal was hired by the Oakland Athletics in October 2015 for a two-week coaching stint as a guest instructor in their instructional league in Arizona, becoming the first female coach for a Major League Baseball team.  David Frost, the A’s assistant general manager, stated that they were thrilled that "Justine will be joining us for instructional league.... she brings with her a wealth of knowledge and expertise from years of playing, coaching, and teaching the game and all of our young players will benefit greatly from her time in camp."

In September 2016 she was an in-uniform mental skills coach for Israel at the 2017 World Baseball Classic qualifier. In addition, Justine's duties included throwing bp, helping on-field practice, and charting the opposing pitchers.

Baseball For All 
Growing up being told that baseball is a sport for boys, while softball is the sport for girls, influenced her to start her own nonprofit organization called Baseball For All when she was 23 years old. Siegal is the founder and executive director of Baseball for All, an organization that works toward gender equity in youth baseball by strongly encouraging and providing opportunities for girls to participate in baseball.

Baseball For All encourages and provides equal opportunities for girls with the same passion for baseball to connect and foster that passion playing baseball. Through Baseball For All she is trying to get rid of the status quo of females being discouraged from playing baseball. Baseball For All encourages young girls to pursue their love for baseball, and educates the public on the importance of equal opportunities for men and women. The programs works on giving girls the sources needed to participate in the sport whether it means becoming a player, coach, umpire, or filling other baseball roles in hopes that other communities will extend their baseball programs to girls.

Recognition and Honors 
Siegal was one of the first winners of ESPNW's Everyday Heroes.
Siegal's Cleveland Indians jersey was on display in the National Museum of American Jewish History’s exhibit Chasing Dreams: Baseball & Becoming American. 
Siegal donated her Oakland Athletics jersey to the Baseball Hall of Fame.  
Siegal was nominated for the IOC Woman in Sports Award.
Siegal was inducted into the Women's Sports Museum with the Trailblazer award.

See also
 Women in baseball

References

External links
Official Website
Baseball for All website
Twitter

1975 births
Living people
American expatriate baseball people in Japan
American sportswomen
Baseball coaches from New York (state)
Beloit College alumni
Brewster Academy alumni
Female sports coaches
Gender studies academics
Hawken School alumni
Jewish American baseball coaches
Kent State University alumni
Minor league baseball coaches
Oakland Athletics coaches
Sportspeople from Cleveland
Springfield College (Massachusetts) alumni
Springfield Pride baseball coaches
St. Olaf College alumni